Requirements engineering tools are usually software products to ease the RE processes and allow for more systematic and formalized handling of requirements, change management and traceability.

The PMI guide Requirements Management: A Practical Guide recommends that a requirements tool should be identified at the beginning of the project, as [requirements] traceability can get complex and that switching tool mid-term could present a challenge.

According to ISO/IEC TR 24766:2009, six major tool capabilities exist:

 Requirements elicitation
 Requirements analysis
 Requirements specification
 Requirements verification and validation
 Requirements management
 Other capabilities

RE tool list 
As with most software, the vendor/owner, tool name or scope change over time.

Note that compliance with, for example, safety standards such as ISO 26262 is supported by few tools directly or indirectly via specialist consulting.

Unlike the major six tool capabilities (see above), the following categories are introduced for the list, which correlate closer with the product marketing or summarizes capabilities, such as RM including the elicitation, analysis and specification parts, and TM meaning verification & validation capabilities.

Specialties, such as OSLC-support, are not presented in the current list, but exist for some tools.

List capabilities 
Agile: The tool supports agile methodologies, such as Scrum, Kanban, collaborative working etc.
ALM: Application lifecycle management (meaning, the tool offers a full set of capabilities or can be extended)
CM: Configuration management (software or hardware)
ISM: Issue resolution management (or problem resolution management)
PDM: Product data management
PLM: Product lifecycle management
 PJM: Project management
 RM: Requirements management incl. design, specification, etc.
TM: Test management (QA)
VCS: Version control system
VM_MBSE: Visual/UI/UX modeling or MBSE (Model-based systems engineering)
Other: Other

Excluded capabilities (limited list) 

 CI/CD
Process management (Process design, etc.)
 QM: Quality management
Risk management
Release/Patch management
Safety or Security
Variants management

RE tool list

Other tools, developments, specialities 

 ReqInspector
 ReqIF - For example to transfer requirements data from one tool to another (e. g. DOORS to DOORS Next)
 Doorstop (hosted on GitHub)

Further reading 

 Winning the Hidden Battle: Requirements Tool Selection and Adoption
 Evaluation of Open Source Tools for Requirements Management
 A case study of requirements management: Toward transparency in requirements management tools
 Modeling requirements with SysML (IREB, 2015)
 Is requirements engineering still needed in agile development approaches? (IREB, 2015)
 DOORS: A Tool to Manage Requirements
Risto Salo et al. Requirements management in GitHub with a lean approach (2015)

See also 

 Application lifecycle management (ALM)
Change management (engineering)
ISO/IEC 12207
List of SysML tools
List of Unified Modeling Language tools
Model-based systems engineering (MBSE)
Open Services for Lifecycle Collaboration (OSLC)
Product lifecycle management (PLM)
 Product management
 Requirements analysis
 Requirements engineering
 Requirements management
 Scope management
 Software development process
 Systems engineering tools

References

External links 

 www.um.es/giisw/EN/re-tools-survey
 https://www.ppi-int.com/wp-content/uploads/2019/04/PPI-005107-8-Requirements-Management-Tools-190403-1.pdf

Engineering-related lists